Novigrad Podravski is a municipality in the Koprivnica-Križevci County in Croatia. According to the 2011 census, there are 2,872 inhabitants in the area, with Croats forming a majority at 94.5%.

History
In the late 19th century and early 20th century, Novigrad Podravski was part of the Bjelovar-Križevci County of the Kingdom of Croatia-Slavonia.

Religion
Serbian Orthodox Church of Lazarus of the Four Days was built in the village of Plavšinac in 1758. Its iconostasis was painted by the Montenegrin painter Atanas Bocarić. Two of its icons are exhibited in the Museum of the Serbian Orthodox Church in Zagreb. Due to its cultural and architectural features building is classified as a protected cultural property.

References

Municipalities of Croatia
Populated places in Koprivnica-Križevci County